This is a list of all male cricketers who have played first-class, list A or Twenty20 cricket for Canterbury men's cricket team. Seasons given are the first and last seasons the player played for the side. Players did not necessarily play for Canterbury in all of the intervening seasons.

A

B

C

D

E
 Warren Eddington, 1977/78–1984/85
 Henry Edser, 1881/82–1883/84
 Andrew Ellis, 2002/03–2019/20
 Harry Ellis, 1904/05–1908/09
 Ray Emery, 1947/48–1953/54
 John England, 1958/59–1961/62
 Jarrod Englefield, 1999/2000–2002/03
 Cyril Edward Evans, 1919/20–1928/29

F

G

H

I
 Bruce Irving, 1962/63–1972/73
 Brian Isherwood, 1966/67–1972/73

J
 Murray Jack, 1955/56–1957/58
 Charlie Jackman, 1934/35–1936/37
 Jack Jacobs, 1927/28–1937/38
 Harley James, 1997/98–2000/01
 Vincent James, 1939/40–1944/45
 Kyle Jamieson, 2013/14–2018/19
 Terry Jarvis, 1969/70–1970/71
 Trevor Jesty, 1979/80
 Tim Johnston, 2011/12–2017/18
 Noel Jones, 1918/19–1920/21
 Raymond Jones, 1980/81–1984/85

K
 Marty Kain, 2008/09–2010/11
 Simon Keen, 2013/14
 Hamish Kember, 1991/92–1994/95
 Graeme Kench, 1982/83
 Peter Kennedy, 1985/86–1991/92
 Jack Kerr, 1929/30–1939/40
 Jack Kiddey, 1956/57–1964/65
 Harvey King, 1977/78
 Alfred Kinvig, 1901/02–1903/04
 Christopher Kirk, 1967/68–1978/79
 Ernest Kitto, 1894/95
 Nick Kwant, 2017/18

L

M

N

O
 Francis O'Brien, 1932/33–1945/46
 Charles Odell, 1869/70–1870/71
 Henry Ogier, 1887/88–1891/92
 Charlie Oliver, 1923/24–1936/37
 Arthur Ollivier, 1866/67–1882/83
 Frank Ollivier, 1867/68
 Keith Ollivier, 1900/01–1911/12
 Peter O'Malley, 1946/47–1954/55
 Sydney Orchard, 1894/95–1912/13
 Michael Owens, 1991/92–1998/99

P

Q
 John Quinn, 1994/95

R

S

T

U
 Paul Unwin, 1993/94
 Hopere Uru, 1893/94–1894/95
 Ken Uttley, 1940/41–1945/46

V
 Logan van Beek, 2009/10–2016/17
 Johan van der Wath, 2010/11
 Theo van Woerkom, 2015/16–2019/20
 Kruger van Wyk, 2006/07–2009/10
 John Veitch, 1964/65
 Michael Vermuelen, 2009/10
 Luke Vivian, 2004/05–2006/07

W

Y
 Yasir Arafat, 2011/12
 Ben Yock, 1996/97–2000/01
 George Young, 1866/67–1867/68
 Jack Young, 1921/22–1923/24
 Reece Young, 2010/11–2011/12
 Bryan Yuile, 1967/68

Notes

References

Canterbury cricketers